Giambattista Spada or Giovanni Battista Spada (28 August 1597 – 23 January 1675) was a Roman Catholic cardinal.

Biography
On 23 August 1643, he was consecrated bishop by Marcantonio Franciotti, Bishop of Lucca, with Ranuccio Scotti Douglas, Bishop of Borgo San Donnino, and Giovanni Battista Scanaroli, Titular Bishop of Sidon, serving as co-consecrators.

Episcopal succession

References

1597 births
1675 deaths
17th-century Italian cardinals